Los Barriles ("The Barrels") is a town (population 1,174) in La Paz Municipality, Baja California Sur, Mexico. Adjacent to Buenavista, the rural towns straddle the head of Bahía las Palmas on the Gulf of California, where winter westerlies average . Los Barriles is within the transition area of the Baja California peninsula's Sierra de la Laguna where the hills become sandy flats. 

Known for its flyfishing, Los Barriles is also Baja's kitesurfing and windsurfing capital. The town's port was closed on 2 September during the 2013 Pacific hurricane season's Tropical Storm Lorena. In 2006, the Shakespeare Theatre Association's annual conference was held in Los Barriles.

Los Barriles also came into the public eye after 2 boogie boarders were attacked, theoretically, by a 30ft great white shark on December 30th, 2020. Those survivors are now part of a very elite group.

References

Populated places in Baja California Sur
Beaches of Baja California Sur
La Paz Municipality (Baja California Sur)
Populated coastal places in Mexico